Singapore Mediation Centre (SMC) is a not-for-profit organisation structured as a company limited by the guarantee of the Singapore Academy of Law.

History
In 1996, a cross-profession committee on Alternative Dispute Resolution (ADR) chaired by then Senior Parliamentary Secretary, Associate Professor Ho Peng Kee, was formed to study how mediation in Singapore could be promoted outside the courts. The Committee made two main recommendations. One of which was the creation of a commercial mediation centre under the Singapore Academy of Law. This centre, the Singapore Mediation Centre, was launched on 16 August 1997. SMC is limited by the guarantee of the Singapore Academy of Law, a body presided by the Chief Justice of Singapore and governed by a Senate, most of whose members are also judges of the Supreme Court.

SMC is located within the Supreme Court's premises. Mediations at the SMC are usually held at the mediation chambers in the Supreme Court. Mediation provides strategic conflict management in which parties can resolve their own disputes, including commercial, contractual, or matrimonial disputes with the help of a neutral third party. The mediator acts only as a facilitator to guide and regulate the process. The outcome of the mediation is determined by the parties themselves. Mediation is an interest-based approach that is non-confrontational, and focuses on solving problems in regards to the parties' interest. Examples of mediation services are the Healthcare Mediation Scheme, which offers subsidised mediation services for disputes between patients and healthcare institutions, and mediation for disputes arising from the Personal Data Protection Act.

SMC is governed by a Board of Directors chaired by Justice Belinda Ang; and assisted by a Board of Advisors who provide strategic advice to enable SMC to achieve its mission. SMC has 3 panels of mediators, classed as International, Principal and Associate Mediators.

There has been an increase in mediation matters handled by SMC in its over 20-year history. In 2016, it released a record of 499 matters handled in 2016, a 72% increase over 2015. It recorded an 8% increase in matters filed in 2017, and its highest annual quantum of total dispute sums administered in the Centre's history.

With the introduction of the Mediation Act in Singapore on 1 November 2017, the Ministry of Law designated SMC as one of the 4 designated mediation service providers in Singapore, along with the Singapore International Mediation Centre, Tripartite Alliance for Dispute Management and World Intellectual Property Organisation Arbitration and Mediation Center.

References

1997 establishments in Singapore
Legal organisations based in Singapore
Mediation